MacMillan Yard is the main Toronto-area railway classification yard for Canadian National Railway (CN), and is located in the nearby suburb of Vaughan, Ontario. It is the 2nd largest railway classification yard in Canada, after CN's Symington Yard in Winnipeg. It was originally opened in 1965 as Toronto Yard, but was renamed MacMillan Yard in 1975 after former CN president Norman John MacMillan.

MacMillan Yard is located at the junction of the CN York Subdivision and CN Halton Subdivision, spanning the area around the communities of Maple and Concord. The yard measures approximately 3 kilometres in length and 1 kilometre in width, with a north–south orientation. The property is bordered by four main roads:

 Highway 7 (York Regional Road 7) to the south
 Keele Street to the east
 Rutherford Road (Regional Road 73) to the north
 Jane Street to the west

There are five road entrances into the yard which are designated as: S Yard, Jane Street, CargoFlo, Bowes, and Administration.

The yard was developed in the late 1950s as part of CN's redesign of its Toronto trackage network: their "Toronto bypass" project, that moved freight traffic out of the busy downtown Toronto and surrounding area to a new modern freight yard north of the city, accessed by both newly constructed and upgraded railway lines. The first revenue train arrived in the yard on February 6th 1965, but the yard's official opening was on May 17th 1965. Much of CN's freight operations that were once located in Toronto proper (notably at Mimico Yard) were moved to the new yard. The project also freed up track time along CN's downtown rail corridors that allowed the Government of Ontario to establish a new commuter service, GO Transit. 

Much of the yard is composed of side-by-side track, switches, humps, and control tower buildings. The yard is designed to take incoming trains and reorganize and rejoin the individual cars based on destination to create new departing trains. The yard operates 24 hours a day and handles over 1 million cars (loads and empties) per year. It has flat switching capability as well as both dual and single humps. In addition to car handling, other yard facilities include locomotive repair, car washing, and car repair. In one part of the yard, a CargoFlo terminal is used for transferring flowable bulk, dry bulk (plastics) commodities between rail cars to tanker trucks, as well as a small intermodal and RoadRailer operation.

At the time of construction, Vaughan (then known as Vaughan Township) was a largely rural community; however, subsequent development on adjacent properties has created an industrial area surrounded by a variety of industrial consignors, distributors, and suppliers. Some commercial establishments (e.g., restaurants, retail and wholesale outlets) are located along the perimeter of the yard. Several York Region Transit routes, including Viva Orange, operate in the vicinity of the yard; most connect to the northern terminus of the Toronto Transit Commission's Line 1 Yonge-University subway line, but one connects to Rutherford GO Station The closest residential population to a track that carries dangerous goods is located approximately 150 meters from the northernmost extension of the yard near Jane Street. At the southern end of the yard, where several rail lines merge, Highway 7 provides a road bridge. Highway 407 also bridges the southern entry point to MacMillan Yard; all trains enter and exit by way of southern end. Rutherford Road passes over the hump pullback tracks at the north end of the yard. Langstaff Road is bisected by the middle of the yard, but plans have been floated by York Region to construct a bridge over the yard connecting it.

Incidents
On September 17, 2007, while pulling south on the pullback track with consist of 67 loads and 30 empties, weighing about 9054 tons, the 2200 West yard assignment side-collided with the tail end of train M33931-17. The train was departing MacMillan Yard at 15 miles per hour on the Halton outbound track. Two locomotives and two cars of the yard assignment derailed. Six cars on train 339 derailed and/or sustained damage, including two special dangerous goods tank cars containing chlorine (UN1017). Approximately 3785 litres of diesel fuel (UN1202) leaked from the derailed locomotives. There were no injuries.

On July 29, 2015, 91 freight cars ran away in the yard after they separated from a switching locomotive. Nine of those freight cars derailed and two freight cars on an adjacent track were damaged when the runaway cars collided at low speed with other cars that were a part of an incoming train in the yard. No injuries were reported. The Transportation Safety Board sent two inspectors to the site to investigate the incident.

On June 17, 2016, a runaway train incident occurred at the yard, in which 74 rail cars — one of them carrying dangerous goods — rolled away uncontrolled for five kilometres, continuing outside the yard onto the mainline. The TSB said that ground crews were using a remote control device known widely in the industry as a "belt pack" to assemble a train when the 72 loaded cars — as well as two empty ones — rolled away uncontrolled.

On May 12, 2017, a derailment caused a chemical spill. At around 11:30 p.m. ET, a locomotive derailed and "sideswiped" seven hopper cars. The impact resulted in a spill of a powdered form of terephthalic acid, a compound used in the manufacturing of plastics.

On August 15, 2019, another derailment caused the death of a worker. At around 2 a.m. ET, emergency services were called. They found a CN worker trapped beneath a rail car that had derailed and fallen on its side. The employee died as a result of injuries sustained in the incident.

References

External Links 
Toronto, MacMillan Yard, Canadian National Railway Company.

Canadian National Railway facilities in Ontario
Rail infrastructure in the Regional Municipality of York
Rail transport in Vaughan